Clinton Babbitt (November 16, 1831March 11, 1907) was a U.S. Representative from Wisconsin.

Born in Westmoreland, New Hampshire, Babbitt attended the common schools and was graduated from Keene (New Hampshire) Academy. He moved to Wisconsin in 1853 and settled near Beloit in Rock County. He engaged in agricultural pursuits.

Babbitt was elected alderman and was a member of the first city council of Beloit. He was an unsuccessful Democratic candidate for election in 1880 to the Forty-seventh Congress. He was appointed postmaster of Beloit by President Cleveland on August 2, 1886, and served until August 17, 1889, when a successor was appointed. He was appointed secretary of the state agricultural society of Wisconsin in 1885 and served until 1899.

Babbitt was elected as a Democrat to the Fifty-second Congress (March 4, 1891 – March 4, 1893) and represented Wisconsin's 1st congressional district. He was an unsuccessful candidate for reelection in 1892 to the Fifty-third Congress.

He retired from public life and active business pursuits and resided in Beloit until his death on March 11, 1907. He was interred in the Protestant Cemetery.

Sources

1831 births
1907 deaths
People from Westmoreland, New Hampshire
Politicians from Beloit, Wisconsin
Wisconsin city council members
Democratic Party members of the United States House of Representatives from Wisconsin
19th-century American politicians